Cha Young-hyun (born September 24, 2003) is a South Korean figure skater and a tightrope dancer (eoreum-sani) of Namsadang. He is the 2017 South Korean national junior champion  and the 2021 South Korean national bronze medalist. He has competed in the final segment at two ISU Championships (2018 World Junior Championships, 2019 World Junior Championships).

Career

Early career 
Cha started skating in 2007. He performed traditional Korean tightrope dancing in 2011 and holds the record as the youngest tightrope dancer (eoreum-sani) of Namsadang at eight years old.

Junior career

2017-2018 
Cha made his international debut at the ISU Junior Grand Prix circuit in Italy, where he finished in sixteenth place. Following a fifth-place finish at the 2018 South Korean Figure Skating Championships, Cha was selected to compete at the 2018 World Junior Figure Skating Championships, where he placed nineteenth.

2018-2019 
Cha began his season with eighth and seventh place finishes at 2018 JGP Austria and 2018 JGP Slovenia, respectively. Cha was once again selected to compete at the World Junior Championships after placing fourth at the 2019 South Korean Figure Skating Championships. He ultimately finished in twentieth at the Junior Worlds.

2019-2020 
Cha started his season by finishing fifth at 2019 JGP Russia and eleventh at 2019 JGP Italy. He then went on to make his senior international debut at the 2019 CS Asian Open Figure Skating Trophy, where he placed seventh. Following Cha's second consecutive fourth-place finish at the 2020 South Korean Figure Skating Championships, he was selected to represent South Korea at the 2020 Winter Youth Olympics. Cha managed to finish fifth at that event after placing fifth both in both short and free program segments of the competition.

2020-2021 
Cha only competed at the 2021 South Korean Figure Skating Championships during this season, where he won the bronze medal.

2021-2022 
Cha began his season by respectively finishing seventh and fourth at 2021 JGP Slovakia and 2021 JGP Slovenia. After finishing fourth at the 2022 South Korean Figure Skating Championships, Cha concluded his season by finishing nineteenth at the 2022 World Junior Championships.

2022-2023 
Cha began his season with a silver medal at 2022 JGP France. He then went on to compete on the senior level at 2022 CS Nebelhorn Trophy, where he placed tenth. At the 2022 JGP Poland I, Cha's second Junior Grand Prix assignment, he finished fourth. One month later, Cha competed at the 2022 CS Ice Challenge, where he placed tenth.

Programs

Competitive highlights 
CS: Challenger Series; JGP: Junior Grand Prix

Detailed results

Junior level 

 Personal best highlighted in bold.

References

Further reading

External links 
 

2003 births
Living people
South Korean male single skaters
People from Goyang
Figure skaters at the 2020 Winter Youth Olympics
Competitors at the 2023 Winter World University Games
Sportspeople from Gyeonggi Province
21st-century South Korean people